South County Dublin may refer to:

 South Dublin county, formerly part of County Dublin, created in 1994.
 Dublin County South (Dáil constituency) (1969–1981)